Parliamentary elections were held in Colombia on 5 June 1949 to elect the Chamber of Representatives. The result was a victory for the Liberal Party, which won 69 of the 132 seats.

Results

References

Parliamentary elections in Colombia
Colombia
1949 in Colombia
Election and referendum articles with incomplete results